Carlos Moscoso (23 January 1902 - 13 January 1957) was a Peruvian football defender who played for Peru in the 1927 South American Championship.

References

1902 births
1957 deaths
Footballers from Lima
Peruvian footballers
Peru international footballers
Association football defenders
Ciclista Lima Association footballers
Peruvian Primera División players